Phoenix Roadrunners has been the name of several ice hockey teams in Phoenix, Arizona:

 Phoenix Roadrunners (WHL), a defunct ice hockey team in the minor pro Western Hockey League (1967–1974)
 Phoenix Roadrunners (WHA), a defunct ice hockey team in the World Hockey Association (1974–1977)
 Phoenix Roadrunners (CHL), a defunct ice hockey team in the Central Hockey League (1977)
 Phoenix Roadrunners (PHL), a defunct ice hockey team in the Pacific Hockey League (1977–1979)
 Phoenix Roadrunners (IHL), a defunct ice hockey team in the International Hockey League (1989–1997)
 Phoenix Roadrunners (ECHL), a defunct ice hockey team in the ECHL (2005–2009)

See also
The following teams are named after the Phoenix Roadrunners but in different cities:
 Montreal Roadrunners, a defunct roller hockey team in the Roller Hockey International (1995–1997)
 Toronto Roadrunners, a defunct ice hockey team in the American Hockey League (2003–2004)
 Edmonton Road Runners, a defunct ice hockey team in the American Hockey League (2004–2005)
 Santa Fe RoadRunners, a defunct ice hockey team in the North American Hockey League (2004–2007)
 Topeka RoadRunners, a defunct ice hockey team in the North American Hockey League (2007–2018)
 Tucson Roadrunners, an active ice hockey team in the American Hockey League (since 2016)